Robert Sewell may refer to:

 Robert Sewell (historian) (1845–1925), worked in the civil service of the Madras Presidency
 Robert Sewell (lawyer) (1751–1828), Attorney General of Jamaica and member of the Parliament of Great Britain
 Robert Sewell (cricketer) (1866–1901), English cricketer